The year 1721 in architecture involved some significant events.

Buildings and structures

Buildings

Bocking Windmill, Essex, England.
7 Burlington Gardens, later Queensberry House, London, Giacomo Leoni's first design for England
Fort King George, along the Altamaha River in the modern-day US state of Georgia
Ruthven Barracks in Scotland completed
Jackson Square (New Orleans), New France
Nazarbaug Palace, Gujarat, India
Ellingen Residence in Ellingen, Bavaria completed in its Baroque form
Písek Gate, Prague, Czech Republic
Saint Paul the First Hermit Cathedral completed as parish church of San Pablo, Laguna, Philippines

Awards
 Grand Prix de Rome, architecture: Philippe Buache.

Births
March 5 – John Adam, architect, brother of Robert Adam and James Adam (died 1792)
March 26 - Nicolas Le Camus de Mézières, French architect (Bourse de Commerce) and author  (died 1793)
date unknown
Francesco Sabatini, Sicilian architect working in Spain (died 1797)
Thomas Sandby, English draughtsman, watercolour artist, architect, and teacher (died 1798)

Deaths
February 11 – Carlo Francesco Bizzaccheri, Italian architect (born 1656)
June 11 – Sir Anthony Deane, English naval architect, shipbuilder and politician (born 1633)

References

architecture
Years in architecture
18th-century architecture